Precious Love may refer to:
Precious Love (Jody Watley song) a song by Jody Watley
Precious Love (The Onset song) a song by The Onset
Precious Love (Bob Welch song) a song by Bob Welch
"Precious Love", a song by Cubic U (Hikaru Utada) from the album Precious
"Precious Love", a song by Korean girl group, Twice from the album Page Two

See also
Your Precious Love a song by Marvin Gaye and Tammi Terrell